Bill Justinussen (born 1963) is a Faroese politician who served as Minister of Health from 2002 to 2004. He also was the President of the West Nordic Council from 2014 to 2015, and the chairman of the Centre Party from 1997 to 1999.

He has also been a Member of the Løgting (the Faroese Parliament) since 2003.

References

External links 
Bill Justinussen on the Faroese Parliament website

Living people
1963 births
Centre Party (Faroe Islands) politicians
Members of the Løgting
Faroese politicians
People from  Klaksvík